Ytterholmen Lighthouse is a coastal lighthouse in Herøy Municipality in Nordland county, Norway. The lighthouse is owned and operated by the municipality and it can be rented by tourists.

The light emits two white flashes every 30 seconds.

This secondary light emits a white, red or green depending on direction, occulting twice every 10 seconds.

See also

Lighthouses in Norway
List of lighthouses in Norway

References

External links
 Norsk Fyrhistorisk Forening 
 Picture of Ytterholmen Lighthouse

Lighthouses completed in 1910
Lighthouses in Nordland
Herøy, Nordland